Alan Saunders may refer to:

 Alan Saunders (musician) (active 1960s–1970s), member of the Australian country music band the Country Outcasts
 Alan Saunders (police officer) (1886–1964), Inspector-General of Police in Palestine, 1937–1943
 Alan Saunders (public servant) (1892–1957), English public servant and cricketer
 Alan Saunders (broadcaster) (1954–2012), broadcaster for the Australian Broadcasting Corporation

See also
 Allen Saunders (1899–1986), American writer, journalist and cartoonist